The male Palestinian national (association) football team has been under the supervision of 19 different permanent managers since 1998.

Last updated: 14 June 2022. Statistics include FIFA-recognised matches only.

Notes

References

 
Palestine